Sophie Bathsheba Thatcher (born October 18, 2000) is an American actress. She is best known for starring as Natalie in Showtime's psychological drama series Yellowjackets (2021–present), and for her appearance in The Book of Boba Fett (2022). In 2018, she made her big screen debut in the American science fiction film Prospect. Thatcher's work on stage includes productions of Oliver!, Seussical, The Diary of Anne Frank, and The Secret Garden.

Early life
Thatcher attended Evanston Township High School. She grew up singing and started acting when she was 4 years old. She went to a performing arts school for musical theater, and her on-camera experience led her to pursue acting more than singing.

Career

2016–present: Early career and breakthrough
Thatcher began her career with a guest role in the police procedural series Chicago P.D. (2016), one of the many entries in the widely known Chicago franchise. The same year, she made another guest appearance in Fox's supernatural horror television series The Exorcist, where she played a younger version of Regan MacNeil.

In 2018, Thatcher made her big screen debut in the science fiction film Prospect, co-starring Pedro Pascal. The film tells the story of a teenage girl and her father (played by Jay Duplass), who travel to an alien moon with a contract to mine gems in the moon's poisonous forest. For her performance, she received mostly positive reviews, with Peter Debruge of Variety stating her character  "owes almost entirely to Thatcher", and describing her as "a fresh face who tricks us into assuming she’s just a callow teen, when in fact, she proves to be the film’s toughest character".

The following year, she appeared in Noble Jones' directorial debut The Tomorrow Man. During this time, Thatcher landed the role of Natalie in Yellowjackets. Regarding the process, creator Bart Nickerson said the casting department was searching for "someone who was really free-spirited and unique who could play both a sort of wildness and a vulnerability." Though most of the auditions were held in-person, Thatcher submitted a self-recorded audition tape and was cast as Natalie before Juliette Lewis, who portrays the character's adult counterpart. The pilot episode was greenlit in September and shot in Los Angeles in November 2019.

In 2020, Thatcher starred in When the Streetlights Go On, a short-form streaming series directed by Rebecca Thomas. The series debuted on Quibi on April 6. In November 2020, Thatcher was rumored to be joining The Mandalorian franchise but it was unknown in which series she would appear. In December 2020, Showtime gave Yellowjackets a series order.

Yellowjackets premiered in November 2021 to rave reviews and became the second-most streamed series in Showtime's history behind Dexter: New Blood. After months of speculation, Thatcher was also confirmed to be appearing in The Book of Boba Fett. She starred as Drash, the leader of a group of cyborgs who work for Boba Fett.

Upcoming projects
Thatcher is set to star alongside Chris Messina in 2023's The Boogeyman, based on the Stephen King short story of the same name.

Filmography

Film

Television

Music videos

References

External links

2000 births
21st-century American actresses
Actresses from Evanston, Illinois
American child actresses
American film actresses
American stage actresses
Evanston Township High School alumni
Living people